The Polish Labour Party - August 80 (PPP) was a minor left-wing political party in Poland, describing itself as socialist. It was created on 11 November 2001 as the Alternative – Labour Party (Alternatywa – Partia Pracy) and acquired its new name of Polish Labour Party in 2004, before adding the suffix -August 80 on 20 November 2009.

The party was opposed to privatisation of state assets resulting from the post-communist reforms of the 1990s and supported increased state expenditure. It was opposed to Polish involvement in the European Union and supported increased cooperation with Poland's eastern neighbours, free education and health care, free (state funded) contraception and abortions, recognition of same-sex civil unions, the withdrawal of Polish troops from Iraq, the elimination of conscription and the introduction of a professional military, and the introduction of a 35-hour working week. It opposed the introduction of a flat tax and the introduction of capital punishment. The PPP also advocated a withdrawal from the concordat between the Polish state and the Catholic Church.

The Party's candidate in the 2005 Polish presidential election, Daniel Podrzycki, died in a car accident on September 24, 2005, one day prior to the parliamentary elections. The party achieved 91,266 votes or 0.77% in the 2005 elections, In the 2007 parliamentary elections the party won 0.99% of the popular vote and no seats in the Sejm and the Senate of Poland.

On 14 September 2015, the PPP joined the United Left (ZL) electoral alliance which was formed as a response for the poor performance of the Polish Left in the 2015 presidential election. The alliance received 7.6% of the vote in the 2015 parliamentary election below the 8% electoral threshold leaving it with no parliamentary representation.

See also
Polish Communist Party (2002)
Socialist Alternative (Poland)
Workers' Democracy (Poland)
Young Socialists (Poland)

References

External links
Polska Partia Pracy (Official website)
Where Does the Left Come From?. Interview with Boguslaw Zietek, International Viewpoint, 2006

2001 establishments in Poland
2017 disestablishments in Poland
Anti-capitalist political parties
Defunct socialist parties in Poland
Far-left political parties
Labour parties
Marxist parties
Political parties disestablished in 2017
Political parties established in 2001